Influence  is the seventh studio album by industrial rock band Sister Machine Gun.

Track listing

 To Hell With You
 Another One Down
 Influence
 Clean
 The Death Of Me
 Everything Else
 Motivator
 Entropy
 Everybody	
 Denial	
 Antagonizer Prelude
 The Antagonizer

References

2003 albums
Sister Machine Gun albums